Dibër is a municipality in Dibër County, northeastern Albania. The municipality consists of the administrative units of Arras, Fushë-Çidhën, Kala e Dodës, Kastriot, Lurë, Luzni, Maqellarë, Melan, Muhurr, Selishtë, Sllovë, Tomin, Zall-Dardhë, Zall-Reç with Peshkopi constituting its seat. As of the Institute of Statistics estimate from the 2011 census, there were 61,619 inhabitants in Dibër Municipality.

Geography

Dibër Municipality is located on the bank of Black Drin in northeastern Albania adjacent to the border with North Macedonia. The Korab Mountain is the highest mountain in Albania and forms alongside the Deshat Mountain the eastern of border of Dibër Municipality. Lurë-Dejë National Park sprawls in the remote mountainous west of the area with Korab-Koritnik Nature Park extending in the east.

Demography 

Despite the municipality's proximity to North Macedonia, Dibër's ethnic make-up is relatively homogeneous, but there is a small Macedonian minority living in the villages around Maqellarë. Unlike the Macedonians who live around Lake Prespa, Macedonians in Dibër have no linguistic rights and no autonomous subdivisions. There has been an active campaign to change this situation for almost ten years.

Almost 90 percent of the population are Muslim, while the Macedonian minority is Orthodox. The Khalwati order has a khanqah in the village of Herbel, while Allajbegi's Mosque in Maqellarë is a recognised cultural monument.

Albanians and Macedonians in the area often have relatives in North Macedonia, so there is a lot of interaction across the national border. Like all the rural municipalities of Albania, Dibër is heavily effected by emigration.

See also 
List of mayors of Dibër

Notes

References

External links 

dibra.gov.al – Official Website 

 
Gegëri
Municipalities in Dibër County